John Falconet, (1350–1400s) was an English nobleman, member of the Court of Philippa of Lancaster.

Biography 

Falconet was born in England, son of Simon Folche and Mary de Kerche. All his paternal ancestors were members of the Parliament of England.

in 1386, Falconet arrived in Portugal, as a member of the delegation of John of Gaunt. He was married to Maria da Silva, daughter of Gonçalo Anes de Abreu.

John Falconet died in the early 15th century, in the city of Benavente.

References

External links 
Nobiliário de familias de Portugal (FALCOINS)

1350 births
1400s deaths
14th-century Portuguese nobility
15th-century Portuguese nobility
14th-century English nobility

Portuguese people of British descent